The Facta II government of Italy held office from 1 August 1922 until 31 October 1922, a total of 91 days, or 2 months and 30 days.

Government parties
The government was composed by the following parties:

Composition

References

Italian governments
1922 establishments in Italy
1922 disestablishments in Italy